The Festival of Northern Lights is a large award-winning display of Christmas lights in Owen Sound, Ontario, Canada. The celebration runs from mid November into January and it attracts 20,000 people each year. The Festival is a brainchild of Marie Walpole in 1987.

Approximately 25 kilometers of light strings and 400 lighted designs are displayed over city streets and parks. It has been named one of the top 100 festivals in Ontario for 2009 by Festivals and Events Ontario, an industry organization.

In its 21st year in 2008 it was gradually converted to LED lights from traditional incandescent lights out of respect for the environment. This effort aimed to reduce operating costs allowing the festival operators to expand the magnitude of the festival.

References

External links
 Official festival website
 Festivals & Events in Ontario April 2012 - March 2013
 Travel to Ontario

Owen Sound
Festivals in Ontario
Winter festivals in Canada
Christmas festivals
Winter traditions
Tourist attractions in Grey County
Recurring events established in 1987
1987 establishments in Ontario
Light festivals